Ahn Si-ha is a South Korean actress and musical actress. She is best known for her roles in dramas such as Moonshine, Delayed Justice, The King: Eternal Monarch and All of Us Are Dead.

Filmography

Television series

Film

Theatre

Awards and nominations

References

External links 
 
 

1982 births
Living people
21st-century South Korean actresses
South Korean television actresses
South Korean film actresses